The 1986 Christchurch mayoral election was part of the New Zealand local elections held that same year. In 1986, election were held for the Mayor of Christchurch plus other local government positions. The polling was conducted using the standard first-past-the-post electoral method.

Background
Sitting Mayor Hamish Hay was re-elected for a fifth term with a decreased majority, defeating councillor Alex Clark of the Labour Party, who had likewise lost to Hay in 1977. Concurrent to Hay retaining the mayoralty the Citizens' Association kept control of the Christchurch City Council with the composition of the council being ten seats to nine.

Postal voting was used for the first time in local elections in Christchurch the advent of which was credited with a larger turnout of voters, an increase of 22 percent.

Results
The following table gives the election results:

Ward results
Candidates were also elected from wards to the Christchurch City Council.

References

Mayoral elections in Christchurch
1986 elections in New Zealand
Politics of Christchurch
October 1986 events in New Zealand
1980s in Christchurch